Yokou can be a misspelling of:

 Youku
 Yoko (disambiguation)